

Army Group South Ukraine was a German army group on the Eastern Front during World War II.

Army Group South Ukraine was created on 5 April 1944 by renaming Army Group A. This army group saw action during the Jassy-Kishinev Operation and after taking heavy casualties was redesignated Army Group South (Heeresgruppe Süd) at midnight on 23 September 1944.

Order of Battle, June 1944
 Sixth Army - General der Artillerie Maximilian Fretter-Pico
 Eighth Army - General der Infanterie Otto Wohler
 Romanian Third Army
 Romanian Fourth Army

Commanders

Notes

Bibliography

Citations

References
 
 

South Ukraine
Military units and formations established in 1944
Military units and formations disestablished in 1944